The Uzbekistan women's national football team represents Uzbekistan in international women's football. It has played in five Asian Continental championships but has not yet qualified for the Olympics or the World Cup. The team won the regional Central Asian Football Association women's championship in 2018.

FIFA World Ranking

 Best Ranking   Best Mover   Worst Ranking   Worst Mover

All-time results
 The following table shows Uzbekistan's all-time international record.

Results and fixtures

The following is a list of match results in the last 12 months, as well as any future matches that have been scheduled.

 Legend

2022

2023

 Fixtures and results (Uzbekistan Football Association) – ufa.uz
 Fixtures and results (Uzbekistan) – Soccerway.com

Coaching staff

Current coaching staff

Manager history

Players

Up-to-date caps, goals, and statistics are not publicly available; therefore, caps and goals listed may be incorrect.

Current squad

*Appearances and goals correct as of 5 April 2021.

Recent call-ups
The following players have been called up to the squad in the past 12 months.

Records

*Active players in bold, statistics correct as of 28 August 2021.

Most capped players

Top goalscorers

Competitive record

FIFA Women's World Cup

*Draws include knockout matches decided on penalty kicks.

Olympic Games

*Draws include knockout matches decided on penalty kicks.

AFC Women's Asian Cup

*Draws include knockout matches decided on penalty kicks.

Asian Games

CAFA Women's Championship

Turkish Women's Cup

Yongchuan International Tournament

See also

Sport in Uzbekistan
Football in Uzbekistan
Women's football in Uzbekistan
Uzbekistan women's national under-20 football team
Uzbekistan women's national under-17 football team
Uzbekistan men's national football team

References

External links
 Official website
 Uzbekistan profile at FIFA.com

Asian women's national association football teams
national
W